The Oboe Concerto No. 3 in G minor (HWV 287) was composed by George Frideric Handel for oboe, orchestra and basso continuo, possibly in 1704-1705, when he was still in Hamburg. It was first published in Leipzig in 1863 (from unknown sources) in which it was described as a work from 1703. No other source for the work is known. Other catalogues of Handel's music have referred to the work as HG xxi, 100; and HHA iv/12,3.

A typical performance of the work takes around ten minutes.

Movements
The work consists of four movements:

See also
 Handel's concertos

References

Note: the Grove 2001 edition incorrectly marks this concerto as HWV 303.

Concertos by George Frideric Handel
Handel 3
1705 compositions
Compositions in G minor